William John Perry (22 September 1886 – 16 February 1970) was a Welsh rugby union player who played rugby union at club level for Neath and was also selected to represent Glamorgan County. Perry represented Wales on one occasion, facing England in 1911.

International matches

Wales
  1911

References

1886 births
1970 deaths
Glamorgan Police officers
Glamorgan County RFC players
Neath RFC players
Newport RFC players
Rugby league second-rows
Rugby union players from Neath
Rugby union props
Wales international rugby union players
Welsh police officers
Welsh rugby union players